Jack Hutchins may refer to:

 Jack Hutchins (runner) (1926–2008), Canadian middle-distance runner
 Jack Hutchins (footballer) (born 1992), Australian rules football player